Walter Siverly Borland (sometimes spelled Boreland) (February 1, 1878 – November 22, 1959) was an American college football and college baseball coach. He served as the head football coach at Louisiana State University from 1901 to 1903, compiling a record of 15–7. Borland was also the head coach of the LSU baseball team from 1902 to 1903, tallying a mark of 10–11–1. Borland was a graduate of Allegheny College in 1900. While at Allegheny College, he was captain of the baseball team and sophomore class president in 1898.  He was a member of Sigma Alpha Epsilon fraternity at Allegheny College. He died in 1959 and was buried in Oil City, Pennsylvania.

Head coaching record

Football

Baseball

References

External links
 

1878 births
1959 deaths
LSU Tigers football coaches
LSU Tigers baseball coaches
Allegheny College alumni
People from Oil City, Pennsylvania
Coaches of American football from Pennsylvania
Baseball coaches from Pennsylvania